James Kenneth Chapman, known professionally as Maps, is an English record producer, songwriter and remixer.

Start Something
In 2006, he recorded his Start Something EP by himself on his 16-track recorder. He released it on his own record label, Last Space Recordings, and it was met with some critical acclaim. The single "Lost My Soul" polled at number 26 in NME's Top 50 singles of 2006.

We Can Create
On 19 May 2007, his debut studio album We Can Create was released on Mute Records. Since its release, the album has been seen as a critical success even though sales have been fairly modest. His first North American release, To the Sky EP, was digitally released on 22 May on the same label.

Maps has toured playing the album's songs with a full live line-up. For the touring of We Can Create, James was supported by four local musicians for live shows. On 17 July, it was announced that We Can Create had been nominated for the Mercury Music Prize. However, it lost out to Klaxons' debut album Myths of the Near Future.

Turning the Mind
On 22 February 2009, James wrote on his MySpace blog about his new upcoming album, saying "I've never been more confident and excited about this new album". In an interview he posted on the same blog, he mentioned the new album's themes as being "mental states" and "chemicals".

Turning the Mind was released on 28 September 2009 in Europe, and 20 October in North America.

Vicissitude
Maps' third album, titled Vicissitude, was released on Mute on 8 July 2013. He has been quoted as saying "It will be darker than 'We Can Create', but more positive and hopeful than 'Turning The Mind'. It'll be different, but it will definitely still be Maps".

Realigned
A compilation album of remixes, titled Realigned, was released on Mute on 15 August 2014. It is a collection of remixed tracks from all three of Maps' studio albums.

onDeadWaves
In 2016 Chapman collaborated with Mute Records label mate Polly Scattergood, under the name onDeadWaves. They released their self-titled album to positive reviews, and played live shows to promote the album, including some support slots with M83 (band)

Colours. Reflect. Time. Loss.
Chapman released his fourth studio album, Colours. Reflect. Time. Loss., through Mute Records on 10 May 2019. It is said to be his most ambitious work to date, and has seen him work with orchestral musicians, female vocalists, percussionists and a drummer. Maps returned to the live arena that same year to promote the album with a full live band, for a number of shows in the U.K., including a sold out show at The Purcell Room, Southbank Centre in July 2019.

Discography

Studio albums

Extended plays

Singles

References

External links
 
 Interview with James Chapman at Liberation Frequency
 Interview with James Chapman for www.4ortherecord.com

21st-century English musicians
English electronic musicians
English male musicians
English record producers
English songwriters
Living people
Mute Records artists
People from Northampton
Musicians from Northamptonshire
Remixers
Year of birth missing (living people)
21st-century British male musicians
British male songwriters